The University of Mendoza (Spanish: Universidad de Mendoza, UM) is an Argentine non-profit private university in the city of Mendoza with a branch in the city of San Rafael.

History
The University of Mendoza was established on December 22, 1959. The university is the oldest and biggest private non-profit institution in the region of Cuyo.

Schools

School of Design, Architecture and Urban Design
Architecture and Urban Design  (R.I.B.A. Accredited Program)
Interior Architecture 
Graphic Design
Fashion Design

The Department of Architecture has a RIBA/CONEAU-accredited five-year, full-time course of studies in architecture leading to the UM Intermediate Examination (RIBA Part 1) and UM Final Examination (RIBA Part 2).

School of Engineering
Computer Hardware Engineering 
Computer Software Engineering 
Industrial Engineering 
Informatics Engineering 
Electronics Engineering
Bioengineering

School of Law
Law
Notary

School of Medicine
Medicine
Nursing 
Anesthesiology
Clinical Pathology 
Surgery 
Haematology
Radiology

School of Dentistry
Dentistry

School of Psychology
Psychology

School of Economic Sciences
Accountancy
Business Administration

Academic reputation 

The University of Mendoza has earned recognition for quality in architecture, law, medicine and engineering.

Notable people
 Noemí Goytia (born 1936), architect, professor

Universities in Mendoza Province
Buildings and structures in Mendoza, Argentina
Educational institutions established in 1939
Mendoza
Forestry education
1939 establishments in Argentina